Timeline of anthropology, 1920–1929

Events

1922
Nanook of the North is released in theatres.
1924Taung child fossil discovered.

Publications
1921Language: An Introduction To The Study Of Speech by Edward Sapir

1922Argonauts of the Western Pacific by Bronislaw Malinowski
1925Handbook of the Indians of California by Alfred Kroeber
1927Sex and Repression in Savage Society by Bronislaw Malinowski
1928Coming of Age in Samoa'' by Margaret Mead

Births

1921
Mary Douglas

1922
Sidney Mintz

1924
Colin Turnbull
1925
Kathleen Aberle
Carlos Castaneda
Frantz Fanon
Ernest Gellner
Claude Meillassoux
1926
Nakane Chie
Clifford Geertz
Robert Paine
Roy Rappaport
1927
Elizabeth Warnock Fernea
Marvin Harris
Dell Hymes
1928
Fredrik Barth
William Bright
Noam Chomsky

Deaths
1921
James Mooney

1922
W. H. R. Rivers
1928
Pliny Earle Goddard

See also

References

Anthropology by decade
Anthropology
Anthropology timelines
1920s decade overviews